The siege of Santo Domingo was fought between April23, 1655 and April30, 1655, at the Spanish Colony of Santo Domingo. A force of 2,400 Spanish troops led by Governor Don Bernardino Meneses y Bracamonte, Count of Peñalba successfully resisted a force of 13,120 soldiers led by General Robert Venables and 34 ships under Admiral Sir William Penn
of the English Commonwealth.

Background
In 1655 the Commonwealth of England, under Oliver Cromwell, decided to declare war on Spain. Religious fanaticism played a role in this, as the puritans running the Commonwealth loathed the Catholicism of Spain. More practically, England had a large standing army with ambitious commanders and Cromwell wished to occupy them with a successful campaign, preferably far from home. In addition it was believed that war with Spain would be both easy and profitable.

Command of an expedition to the Caribbean to capture Spanish colonies named the "Western Design" was given to General Robert Venables, with Admiral Sir William Penn commanding the naval contingent of 34 ships. Their authority was constrained by two Civil Commissioners whom Cromwell has tasked with ensuring the loyalty of both Venables and Penn. The 13,000 troops sent to the Caribbean were selected for the mission based on which would be least missed due to perceived practical or political weakness. Administrative and financial problems meant that the expedition sailed short of equipment and supplies. It was hoped that the English might take possession of Santo Domingo, Cuba and Puerto Rico.

Invasion

High winds and surf made it difficult for the English to land near their first objective, the city of Santo Domingo. They eventually landed on April13, 1655. However, the 13,000 Englishmen were put ashore at the mouth of the Nizao River, some thirty miles from the city. It took them four days, short of water, food and military supplies, to make their way to within sight of the city. They were then ambushed and routed by 2–300 local militia. Spanish records assert that some 1,500 British soldiers were killed, wounded and or taken prisoner. The English fleet carried out an ineffectual attempt to bombard the city into submission, then sailed off to re-embark the army's survivors.

Aftermath
The British naval historian N.A.M. Rodger notes that "in one afternoon the invincible reputation of the New Model Army had been thrown away". The English left Santo Domingo and sailed for Jamaica, which they successfully conquered in a six-day campaign.

Venables and Penn were disgraced and imprisoned in the Tower of London. Historian C.H. Firth opined that the main cause of the failure at Hispaniola was the lack of co-operation on the part of Venables and Penn. Venables never obtained the confidence either of his officers or his soldiers. Samuel Pepys, Clerk of the Acts to the Navy Board, considered Admiral Penn a "false knave". Historian John Morrill wrote  "[Venables] was over-promoted and under-supported in a high-profile fiasco in the Caribbean that cost him his reputation."  His army was composed of inferior and undisciplined troops hastily assembled and badly equipped.

Due to the valor of the governor, Don Bernardino de Meneses y Bracamonte, Count of Peñalva, the site of the battle was named in his honor: Puerta del Conde, the Count's Gate. One anecdote of the invasion is that the English were terrified by the nocturnal noise of the crabs on the beach of Haina; in honour of the victory the Spaniards created a commemorative gold crab, which they paraded down the streets of Santo Domingo in triumph. The gold crab has not survived; it was stolen by General Joseph de Barquier, the last French governor on the island.

British Fleet

British Army

Notes

See also 
 Anglo-Spanish War (1654–60)

References

Further reading
 Kris E. Lane, Pillaging the Empire: Piracy in the Americas, 1500-1750.

Conflicts in 1655
1655 in the Caribbean
1650s in New Spain
History of Hispaniola
Battles involving Spain
Santo Domingo
Santo Domingo
1655 in the British Empire
History of Santo Domingo
History of the Dominican Republic 
Anglo-Spanish War (1654–1660)